Allahabad (also Romanized as Allāhābād; also known as Allah Abad Rastagh and Elahābād) is a village in Allahabad Rural District of Zarach District of Yazd County, Yazd province, Iran. At the 2006 National Census, its population was 3,068 in 770 households. The following census in 2011 counted 4,626 people in 1,149 households. The latest census in 2016 showed a population of 5,573 people in 1,443 households; it was the largest village in its rural district.

References 

Yazd County

Populated places in Yazd Province

Populated places in Yazd County